The 1976–77 NBA season was the SuperSonics' 10th season in the NBA.

Draft picks

Roster

Depth chart

Regular season

Season standings

Record vs. opponents

Game log

Player statistics

References

Seattle SuperSonics seasons
Seattle